Chionodes impes is a moth in the family Gelechiidae. It is found in North America, where it has been recorded from eastern Washington to California.

The larvae feed on Antennaria dimorpha.

References

Chionodes
Moths described in 1999
Moths of North America